Romanzo criminale ("Criminal Novel") is an Italian-language film released in 2005, directed by Michele Placido, a criminal drama, it was highly acclaimed and won 15 awards. It is based on Giancarlo De Cataldo's 2002 novel, which is in turn inspired by the Banda della Magliana true story. The Magliana gang was one of the most powerful Italian criminal associations, dominating Rome's drug, gambling and other kinds of crime activities from the early 1970s to 1992 (death of Enrico De Pedis). The gang's affiliates start their career kidnapping rich people, drug dealing (hashish, cocaine, heroin, etc.) from the 1970s they started working with the Italian secret service, fascists, terrorists, the Sicilian Mafia, Camorra and many more.
Some gang members are still alive, as inmates of an Italian prison, or justice collaborators.
The film is something of a showcase for a number of Italy's leading young film and television actors, notably Favino, who won a Donatello award for his performance as Lebanese.
In 2008 a spin-off TV series commenced broadcasting (Romanzo criminale – La serie).

Plot
In 1970s Rome, four young delinquents, nicknamed Ice, Lebanese, Dandi and Grand steal a car. Crashing through a police road block, the driver, Grand is crushed by the steering column. Back at their hideout, a small disused caravan near a beach, they are discovered by the police. Cold, Lebanese and Dandi run away, but are captured. Grand, who is mortally wounded, dies in the caravan. Roll opening credits. Some years later, in the 1970s, Ice is released from prison and joins up with Lebanese, who tells him he has come up with a plan to kidnap and hold to ransom Baron Rossellini, a wealthy aristocrat for whom Lebanese's parents worked. He has formed a gang with Dandi - they are Black, Bright Eye, Ricotta, Bufalo, Rat and Ciro and Aldo Buffoni. After negotiating the ransom of 3 billion lire, the Baron is shot by one of the Cannizzari brothers who have been entrusted by Lebanese to guard him. Nonetheless, they take a picture of the dead man with a newspaper and get the 3 billion lire. However, the local Police Commissioner Nicola Scialoja manages to record the serial numbers of the ransom money before the gang receives it, setting out to capture the gang. As the gang divide up the money, Lebanese proposes to split 500 million lire between them, and use the remaining 2.5 billion to build a foothold in the criminal underworld of Rome, starting with drug dealing. However, the drugs racket is owned by the dealer Terrible, and so the gang wipe his gang out apart from Gemito, who Lebanese bribes to help them. After his home is raided and his body guards killed, Terrible wakes to find Ice, Lebanese and Dandi in his bedroom. Cornered, he reluctantly agrees to let give control of the racket to the gang.

The gang grows in influence and ambition. Rome falls under their rule, and the rule of Lebanese. Dandi meets and becomes enamoured with an upmarket prostitute, Patrizia, who, in order to be kept under the sway of the gang and in order to prevent Dandi becoming involved in brawls provoked by his jealousy, is bought over and given a brothel. Ice, meanwhile falls in love with his younger brother Gigio's tutor, Roberta. However, Lebanese begins to consider Ice's romance a weakness, a point reinforced when Ice asks to be dismissed from the gang. In response, Lebanese casts up the car theft from their childhood, where his leg was permanently damaged by the pursuing police. Cold and Roberta begin to learn English with the idea that they will elope. However, when Ice is at the Bologna Train Station, there was an organized bombing, representing the state collusion.
Later, Ice receives a phone call informing him that Lebanese is dead, stabbed by Gemito after a bitter game of poker.

Then begins Ice's quest for vengeance, aided by Dandi.

Yet Scialoja is on their trail and succeeds in capturing Ice, then the other members of the gang except Dandi. Ice plans to escape from prison with the help of his friends, but a deadly spiral of score settling has already begun to coil around them all.

Cast 
 Kim Rossi Stuart - Il Freddo
 Anna Mouglalis - Patrizia
 Pierfrancesco Favino - Libano
 Claudio Santamaria - Il Dandi
 Stefano Accorsi - Commissario Scialoja
 Riccardo Scamarcio - Il Nero
 Jasmine Trinca - Roberta
 Toni Bertorelli - La Voce
 Gigi Angelillo - Zio Carlo
 Antonello Fassari - Ciro Buffoni
 Elio Germano - Il Sorcio
 Franco Interlenghi - Barone Rosellini
 Donato Placido - Colussi
 Massimo Popolizio - Il Terribile

External links 
 
 German Blog Article about Romanzo Criminale

2005 films
Italian crime drama films
2000s Italian-language films
Films about organized crime in Italy
Works about the Years of Lead (Italy)
Films directed by Michele Placido
Biographical films about Italian bandits
Films adapted into television shows
Banda della Magliana